Northwest Coast may refer to:
 The coastal region of the Pacific Northwest
 The anthropological term for Indigenous peoples of the Pacific Northwest Coast
 British Columbia Coast
 North West Australia
 North West Tasmania

See also
 North West Coastal Highway, in Western Australia